His Majesty's Solicitor General for England and Wales, known informally as the Solicitor General, is one of the law officers of the Crown in the government of the United Kingdom. They are the deputy of the Attorney General, whose duty is to advise the Crown and Cabinet on the law. They can exercise the powers of the Attorney General in the Attorney General's absence. Despite the title, the position is usually held by a barrister as opposed to a solicitor.

There is also a Solicitor General for Scotland, who is the deputy of the Lord Advocate.  As well as the Sovereign's Solicitor General, the Prince of Wales and a Queen consort (when the Sovereign is male) are also entitled to have an Attorney and Solicitor General, though the present Prince of Wales has only an Attorney General and no Solicitor General.

The Solicitor General is addressed in court as "Mr Solicitor" or "Ms Solicitor". The Solicitor General is shadowed by the Shadow Solicitor General who sits on the Official Opposition frontbench.

The role is held by Michael Tomlinson, who was appointed by Prime Minister Liz Truss on 7 September 2022.

Solicitors-General of England (and Wales), 1461–present

15th century
incomplete
Richard Fowler 1461–1470
Richard Page 1470-1483
Thomas Lynon 1483–1485
Andrew Dimmock 1485–1503

16th century

Thomas Lucas 1503–1507
John Ernley 1507–1514
John Port 1514–1521
Richard Lyster 1521–1525
Christopher Hales 1525–1531
Baldwin Mallet 1531–1533
Richard Rich 1533–1536
William Whorwood 1536–1540
Henry Bradshaw 1540–1545
Edward Griffin 1545–1552
John Gosnold 1552–1553
William Cordell 1553–1557
Richard Weston 1557–1559
William Rosewell 1559–1566
Richard Onslow 1566–1569
Sir Thomas Bromley 1569–1579
Sir John Popham 1579–1581
Sir Thomas Egerton 1581–1592
Sir Edward Coke 1592–1594
Thomas Fleming 1595–1604

17th century

Sir John Doderidge 1604–1607
Sir Francis Bacon 1607–1613
Henry Yelverton 1613–1617
Sir Thomas Coventry 1617–1621
Sir Robert Heath 1621–1625
Sir Richard Shelton 1625–1634
Sir Edward Littleton 1634–1640
Sir Edward Herbert 1640–1641
Oliver St John 1641–1643 (continued to 1648 under parliament)
Sir Thomas Gardiner 1643–1645
Sir Geoffrey Palmer 1645–1649
Sir Edmund Prideaux 1648–1649
John Cooke 1649–1650
Robert Reynolds 1650–1654
William Ellis 1654–1660
Sir Heneage Finch 1660–1670
Sir Edward Turnor 1670–1671
Sir Francis North 1671–1673
Sir William Jones 1673–1674
Sir Francis Winnington 1674–1679
Heneage Finch 1679–1686
Sir Thomas Powys 1686–1687
Sir William Williams 1687–1689
Sir George Treby 1689
Sir John Somers 1689–1692
Sir Thomas Trevor 1692–1695
Sir John Hawles 1695–1702

18th century

Sir Simon Harcourt 1702–1707
Sir James Montagu 1707–1708
Robert Eyre 1708–1710
Sir Robert Raymond 1710–1714
Nicholas Lechmere 1714–1715
John Fortescue Aland 1715–1717
Sir William Thomson 1717–1720
Sir Philip Yorke 1720–1724
Sir Clement Wearg 1724–1725
Charles Talbot 1726–1733
Sir Dudley Ryder 1733–1737
John Strange 1737–1742
William Murray 1742–1754
Sir Richard Lloyd 1754–1756
Charles Yorke 1756–1762
Sir Fletcher Norton 1762–1763
William de Grey 1763–1766
Edward Willes 1766–1768
John Dunning 1768–1770
Edward Thurlow 1770–1771
Alexander Wedderburn 1771–1778
James Wallace 1778–1780
James Mansfield 1780–1782
John Lee 1782
Richard Pepper Arden 1782–1783
John Lee 1783
James Mansfield 1783
Richard Pepper Arden 1783–1784
Archibald Macdonald 1784–1788
Sir John Scott 1788–1793
Sir John Mitford 1793–1799
Sir William Grant 1799–1801

19th century

Spencer Perceval 1801–1802
Sir Thomas Manners-Sutton 1802–1805
Sir Vicary Gibbs 1805–1806
Sir Samuel Romilly 1806–1807
Sir Thomas Plumer 1807–1812
Sir William Garrow 1812–1813
Sir Robert Dallas 1813
Sir Samuel Shepherd 1813–1817
Sir Robert Gifford 1817–1819
Sir John Copley 1819–1824
Sir Charles Wetherell 1824–1826
Sir Nicholas Conyngham Tindal 1826–1829
Sir Edward Sugden 1829–1830
Sir William Horne 1830–1832
Sir John Campbell 1832–1834
Sir Charles Pepys 1834
Sir Robert Rolfe 1834
William Webb Follett 1834–1835
Robert Rolfe 1835–1839
Sir Thomas Wilde 1839–1841
Sir William Webb Follett 1841–1844
Sir Frederic Thesiger 1844–1845
Sir Fitzroy Kelly 1845–1846
John Jervis 1846
Sir David Dundas 1846–1848
Sir John Romilly 1848–1850
Sir Alexander Cockburn 1850–1851
Sir William Page Wood 1851–1852
Sir Fitzroy Kelly 1852
Sir Richard Bethell 1852–1856
James Stuart-Wortley 1856–1857
Sir Henry Singer Keating 1857–1858
Sir Hugh Cairns 1858–1859
Sir Henry Singer Keating 1859
Sir William Atherton 1859–1861
Sir Roundell Palmer 1861–1863
Sir Robert Collier 1863–1866
Sir William Bovill 1866
Sir John Burgess Karslake 1866–1867
Sir Charles Jasper Selwyn 1867–1868
Sir William Brett 1868
Sir Richard Baggallay 1868
Sir John Coleridge 1868–1871
Sir George Jessel 1871–1873
Sir Henry James 1873
Sir William Harcourt 1873–1874
Sir Richard Baggallay 1874
Sir John Holker 1874–1875
Sir Hardinge Giffard 1875–1880
Sir Farrer Herschell 1880–1885
Sir John Eldon Gorst 1885–1886
Sir Horace Davey 1886
Sir Edward Clarke 1886–1892
Sir John Rigby 1892–1894
Sir Robert Reid 1894
Sir Frank Lockwood 1894–1895
Sir Robert Finlay 1895–1900

20th century

2001–present
Colour key (for political parties):

See also

 Solicitor general
 Attorney General for England and Wales
 Law officers of the Crown

References

British lawyers
 Solicitor
Law Officers of the Crown in the United Kingdom
Lists of government ministers of the United Kingdom
 
Solicitors